Cobmoosa was a location in Oceana County, Michigan.  It was named for Cobmoosa, the Odawa leader who the federal government built a log cabin for here in 1858 during the relocation of the Odawa here from Ionia County, Michigan. 

There was a store operated by Cook and Wessel, schools, and post office in Cobmoosa, but after a fire that brought down the post office in 1916, it was never replaced. A lake and the area continue to be called Cobmoosa. The site of the post office is not known; the lake, which was near Cobmoosa, is located west of Walkerville, Michigan. The coordinates provided are for Cobmoosa Lake.

Notes

References

Populated places in Oceana County, Michigan